Tony Hughes (born May 22, 1959) is an American football coach and former player. He currently serves as the associate head coach and tight ends coach at Mississippi State University.

He served as the head football coach at Jackson State University from 2016 to 2018.

References

1959 births
Living people
American football defensive backs
High school football coaches in Mississippi
Jackson State Tigers football coaches
Louisiana Tech Bulldogs football coaches
Mississippi State Bulldogs football coaches
Ole Miss Rebels football coaches
Southern Miss Golden Eagles football players
Saint Paul's Tigers football players
West Alabama Tigers football coaches